Group C of the 1995 Fed Cup Europe/Africa Zone Group II was one of four pools in the Europe/Africa Zone Group II of the 1995 Fed Cup. Five teams competed in a round robin competition, with the top two teams advancing to the play-offs.

Denmark vs. Turkey

Macedonia vs. Lithuania

Denmark vs. Botswana

Macedonia vs. Turkey

Turkey vs. Botswana

Denmark vs. Lithuania

Denmark vs. Macedonia

Lithuania vs. Botswana

Macedonia vs. Botswana

Turkey vs. Lithuania

See also
Fed Cup structure

References

External links
 Fed Cup website

1995 Fed Cup Europe/Africa Zone